Pinkove Zvezde (Serbian Cyrillic: Пинкове Звезде; "Pink Stars") is a Serbian  reality television music competition organized by City Records to find new singing talents. The contestants are aspiring singers drawn from public auditions.

Series overview
To date, 4 series have been broadcast, as summarised below.
 Winning contestant

Regional broadcasts

References

External links
Pinkove zvezde

Serbian music industry
RTV Pink original programming
Music competitions
Serbian talent shows
2010s Serbian television series